William Cleary (20 April 1931 – 12 March 1991) was an English footballer who played at half-back for Sunderland, Norwich City, Wisbech Town, Port Vale, Boston United, and King's Lynn.

Career
Cleary played for South Bank East End and Sunderland (without making a first team appearance), before joining Norman Low's Norwich City in 1953. He played 18 Third Division South games for the "Canaries", as the Carrow Road outfit posted mid-table finishes in 1953–54, 1954–55, and 1955–56. He then played non-league football for Wisbech Town. He was signed again by Norman Low, now manager of Port Vale, in November 1957. He played eight Third Division South and two FA Cup games in the 1957–58 season, but failed to nail down a regular slot at Vale Park and so was transferred to Southern League side Boston United in July 1958. He moved on to King's Lynn, before returning to old club Wisbech Town. He became a coach, manager, and finally a director at the club.

Career statistics

References

1931 births
1991 deaths
Footballers from Middlesbrough
English footballers
Association football midfielders
Sunderland A.F.C. players
Norwich City F.C. players
Wisbech Town F.C. players
Port Vale F.C. players
Boston United F.C. players
King's Lynn F.C. players
English Football League players
Southern Football League players
English football managers
Association football coaches